The 1929 Sewanee Tigers football team represented the Sewanee Tigers of Sewanee: The University of the South as a member of the Southern Conference (SoCon) during the 1929 college football season. Led by W. H. Kirkpatrick in his first and only season as head coach, the Tigers compiled an overall record of 2–5–2 with a mark of 0–4–1 in conference play.

Schedule

References

Sewanee
Sewanee Tigers football seasons
Sewanee Tigers football